Greg Scruggs (born August 17, 1990) is a defensive line coach for Wisconsin. Most recently he was the assistant defensive line coach for New York Jets. Scruggs is a former American football defensive end/tight end. He was drafted by the Seattle Seahawks in the seventh round of the 2012 NFL Draft. He played college football at Louisville.

Early life
Scruggs was born in Cincinnati, Ohio, and lived in the city's Winton Terrace housing project before joining the local Boys Hope Girls Hope residential program in 2003. As a student at St. Xavier High School in Cincinnati, he lived in the Boys Hope House on campus. After playing the quad drums in the school marching band for three years and varsity basketball for two, he reluctantly joined the football team his senior year, at the behest of head coach Steve Specht. Scruggs graduated in 2008.

College career
Scruggs played defensive tackle for the University of Louisville Cardinals and graduated in 2011.

Professional career

Seattle Seahawks
Scruggs was selected as the 25th pick in the seventh round, 232nd overall, in the 2012 NFL Draft by the Seattle Seahawks. NFL Network analyst Bucky Brooks stated that Scruggs is a competitive defensive end with toughness and will have to battle for a backup spot on the Seahawks' roster. On August 27, 2013, the Seahawks placed Scruggs on the reserve/physically unable to perform list. The Seahawks announced on August 31, 2015, they waived Scruggs, making him a free agent.

Chicago Bears 
On December 31, 2015, Scruggs signed with the Chicago Bears. On January 3, 2016, Scruggs recorded his third career sack against the Detroit Lions. 

During the 2016 offseason, Scruggs switched from the defensive end position to tight end. He was released by the Bears on September 27, 2016.

New England Patriots
On October 1, 2016, Scruggs was signed by the New England Patriots. He was placed on injured reserve on October 15, 2016 with a knee injury after being inactive for the first two games he was on the Patriots roster. Scruggs would not play when the Patriots won Super Bowl LI on February 5, 2017. Scruggs won his second Super Bowl championship after the Patriots defeated the Atlanta Falcons by a score of 34–28 in overtime.

Coaching career
In 2018, Scruggs joined Luke Fickell's staff at the University of Cincinnati as the Director of Player Development. For the 2020 season, Scruggs was promoted to the defensive line coach for the Bearcats.

On March 3, 2022, it was reported that Scruggs accepted an assistant defensive line coach position with the New York Jets.

Personal life
Scruggs submitted the winning nomination of his high school coach, Steve Specht, for the 2013 Don Shula NFL High School Coach of the Year Award.

References

Further reading

Seattle Seahawks bio 
Chicago Bears bio

1990 births
American football defensive ends
American football defensive tackles
American football tight ends
Chicago Bears players
Cincinnati Bearcats football coaches
Living people
Louisville Cardinals football players
New England Patriots players
New York Jets coaches
Players of American football from Cincinnati
Seattle Seahawks players
St. Xavier High School (Ohio) alumni